Ilija Abutović (born 2 August 1988) is a Serbian handball player for C' Chartres MHB and the Serbia national team.

Club career
After playing for Spartak Subotica, Abutović was transferred to Partizan in 2007. He moved abroad to Slovenian club Slovan in 2010. Between 2011 and 2018, Abutović spent seven seasons with Vardar and won numerous trophies, including the 2016–17 EHF Champions League.

International career
At international level, Abutović represented Serbia at the 2016 European Championship.

Honours
Partizan
 Serbian Handball Super League: 2008–09
 Serbian Handball Cup: 2007–08
 Serbian Handball Super Cup: 2009
Vardar
 Macedonian Handball Super League: 2012–13, 2014–15, 2015–16, 2016–17, 2017–18
 Macedonian Handball Cup: 2011–12, 2013–14, 2014–15, 2015–16, 2016–17, 2017–18
 EHF Champions League: 2016–17
 SEHA League: 2011–12, 2013–14, 2016–17, 2017–18

References

External links
 

1988 births
Living people
People from Vrbas, Serbia
Serbian male handball players
RK Partizan players
RK Vardar players
Rhein-Neckar Löwen players
Handball-Bundesliga players
Expatriate handball players
Serbian expatriate sportspeople in Slovenia
Serbian expatriate sportspeople in North Macedonia
Serbian expatriate sportspeople in Germany
Serbian expatriate sportspeople in France